Klokoč may refer to:
Klokoč, Croatia
Klokoč, Slovakia